The Crown Minerals Amendment Act 2013 (introduced as the Crown Minerals (Permitting and Crown Land) Bill) is an Act in New Zealand. The Act amends the Crown Minerals Act 1991, the Conservation Act 1987, the Continental Shelf Act 1964, the Reserves Act 1977, and the Wildlife Act 1953 and is "aimed to promote prospecting for, exploration for, and mining of Crown owned minerals for the benefit of New Zealand". It was introduced in the New Zealand Parliament by Phil Heatley on 20 September 2012. The Act received royal assent on 19 May 2013.

See also
Mining in New Zealand
Environment of New Zealand

References

External links
Crown Minerals (Permitting and Crown Land) Bill at the Parliamentary Counsel Office
Crown Minerals (Permitting and Crown Land) Bill at the New Zealand Parliament
Crown Minerals (Permitting and Crown Land) Bill at the Ministry of Business, Innovation and Employment
 Bills Digest No 2004, describing the Bill as introduced (by John McSoriley, New Zealand Parliamentary library)
 Bills Digest No 2029, describing the amendments made by the Commerce Select Committee (by John McSoriley, New Zealand Parliamentary library)
 Bills Digest No 2031, describing further government amendments in Supplementary Order Paper No 205 (by John McSoriley, New Zealand Parliamentary library)

Mining in New Zealand
Environmental issues in New Zealand
Statutes of New Zealand
2013 in New Zealand law